Best Eleven is the oldest monthly football magazine in South Korea. The first edition was published in April 1970. At that time, the magazine's name was Monthly Football. In April 1996, the name was changed to Best Eleven.

References

External links
 Official website

1970 establishments in South Korea
Association football magazines
Magazines published in South Korea
Magazines established in 1970
Monthly magazines